Stylocline gnaphaloides (often misspelled S. gnaphalioides) is a species of flowering plant in the aster family known by the common names mountain neststraw and everlasting neststraw.

Distribution
The plant  is native to southern California and Arizona in the southwestern United States; and to Baja California and Sonora in northwestern Mexico. It can be found in many types of habitat, becoming common in some areas.

Description
Stylocline gnaphaloides is a small annual herb growing at ground level and reaching just a few centimeters in length. It is usually coated in white hairs, often woolly. The small, blunt leaves are alternately arranged, each up to 1.4 centimeters long.

The inflorescence bears spherical flower heads each a few millimeters in diameter. The head has 2 to 4 white-haired phyllaries and tiny woolly white flowers.

References

External links
Jepson Manual Treatment of Stylocline gnaphaloides
Stylocline gnaphaloides — Photo gallery

gnaphaloides
Flora of Baja California
Flora of California
Flora of the Sierra Nevada (United States)
Flora of the California desert regions
Flora of the Sonoran Deserts
Natural history of the California chaparral and woodlands
Natural history of the California Coast Ranges
Natural history of the Central Valley (California)
Natural history of the Channel Islands of California
Natural history of the Colorado Desert
Natural history of the Mojave Desert
Natural history of the Peninsular Ranges
Natural history of the San Francisco Bay Area
Natural history of the Santa Monica Mountains
Natural history of the Transverse Ranges
Taxa named by Thomas Nuttall
Flora without expected TNC conservation status